The Alvis Leonides Major was a British air-cooled 14-cylinder radial aero engine developed by Alvis from the earlier nine-cylinder Leonides.

Design and development

In 1951 Alvis started development of a 14-cylinder, two row radial of 1,118 cu in (18.3 L) displacement, based on the Leonides. The only numerous model of the Major was the Mk. 755/1, a medium supercharged, de-rated, obliquely mounted direct-drive and fan cooled engine fitted to the Westland Whirlwind Mks. 5, 6, 7 and 8.

Variants
Data from:British Piston Engines and their Aircraft.
Leonides Major 702/1
 for aeroplanes, also known as A.LE.M.1-1 in Air Ministry
Leonides Major 751/1
 for helicopters, also known as A.LE.M.1-2
Leonides Major 755/1
 for helicopters in a 35° canted mounting, also known as A.LE.M.1-6 and as Mk.155 in civil aircraft
Leonides Major 755/2
 for helicopters in a vertical mounting, also known as A.LE.M.1-6 and as Mk.160 in civil aircraft

Applications
 Bristol Type 173 Mk3 – 2x 755/1 (Mk.155) ; 2x 755/2 (Mk.160) 
 Handley Page HPR.5 Herald – four  702/1
 Westland Whirlwind 1x 755/1 (Mk.155) or 1x 755/2 (Mk.160)

Specifications (Leonides Major 702/1)

See also

References

Aircraft air-cooled radial piston engines
Leonides
1930s aircraft piston engines

de:Alvis Leonides